Spottobrotula is a genus of cusk-eels.

Species
There are currently 3 recognized species in this genus:
 Spottobrotula mahodadi Cohen & J. G. Nielsen, 1978
 Spottobrotula mossambica J. G. Nielsen, Schwarzhans & Uiblein, 2014 
 Spottobrotula persica J. G. Nielsen, Schwarzhans & Uiblein, 2014

References

Ophidiidae